Phil Purcell may refer to:

 Philip J. Purcell (born 1943), American financial executive
 Phil Purcell (hurler) (1900–1963), Irish hurler